The Theology of Aristotle, also called Theologia Aristotelis is a paraphrase in Arabic of parts of Plotinus' Six Enneads along with Porphyry's commentary. It was traditionally attributed to Aristotle, but as this attribution is certainly untrue it is conventional to describe the author as "Pseudo-Aristotle". It had a significant effect on early Islamic philosophy, due to Islamic interest in Aristotle. Al-Kindi (Alkindus) and Avicenna, for example, were influenced by Plotinus' works as mediated through the Theology and similar works. The translator attempted to integrate Aristotle's ideas with those of Plotinus — while trying to make Plotinus compatible with Christianity and Islam, thus yielding a unique synthesis.

Overview
The Theology of Aristotle, with The Letter on Divine Science and The Sayings of the Greek Sage, a collection of fragments, together form the Plotiniana Arabica.  They seem to have been adapted by Ibn Na'ima al-Himsi, a Christian, and edited by Al-Kindi, a Muslim (both writers were active in the ninth century).

There is also a longer version of the Theology, the authorship of which is uncertain.  According to Shlomo Pines, it may have been written by Isma'ilis.  Paul Fenton, on the other hand, thought it may have been derived from Egyptian Jews.

Just as there is an Arabic paraphrase of Plotinus' Six Enneads, blending it with Aristotle's thought, so also there is an Arabic paraphrase of Aristotle's De Anima, blending it with Plotinus' thought.  Thus later Islamic philosophy, and European philosophy which built on the Islamic philosophical texts, were based on this Neoplatonic synthesis.

Editions

Text
 Badawi, Abdurrahman, Aflutin Ind Al’Arab. Plotinus apud Arabes: Theologia Aristotelis et Fragmenta Quae Supersunt, Cairo 1955 (repr. Kuwait, 1977 and 1995): Arabic original
 A critical edition, following the order of the Arabic, is due to be published by the European Research Council project "Ideas, Advanced Grant 249431", under the supervision of Cristina d'Ancona.

Translations
 Franciscus Patricius, Mystica Aegyptiorum et Chaldaeorum: a Platone voce tradita, et ab Aristotele excepta et conscripta philosophia edente Francisco Patricio, Ferrara 1591: Latin translation
 H.-R. Schwyzer (ed.), Plotini Opera - Tomus II: Enneades IV-V . Plotiniana Arabica ad codicum fidem anglice vertit Geoffrey Lewis, Paris 1959: English translation, following the order of the text of Plotinus
 Luciano Rubio (tr.), Pseudo-Aristóteles, Teologia (Madrid 1978), Spanish
 Catarina Belo (tr.), A Teologia de Aristóteles (2010), translation into Portuguese, based on Badawi's text

See also
, another 9th-century Arabic adaptation of a Neoplatonic work (Proclus' Elements of Theology) falsely attributed to Aristotle

References

Further reading

On The Theology of Aristotle
 Peter Adamson, Arabic Plotinus: A Philosophical Study of the 'Theology of Aristotle''', Gerald Duckworth & Co, London, 2002. 
 M. Aouad, La Théologie d'Aristote et autres textes du Plotinus arabus, in R. Goudet (ed.) Dictionnaire des Philosophes Antiques, Éditions du CNRS, Paris, 1989, pp. 541-90.
 F. W. Zimmermann, The Origins of the so-called Theology of Aristotle, in J. Kraye, W. F. Ryan and C. B. Schmitt (eds) Pseudo-Aristotle in the Middle Ages. The Theology and other Texts, The Warburg Institute, London, 1986, pp. 110-240.
 C. D'Ancona, The Greek Sage, the pseudo-Theology of Aristotle and the Arabic Plotinus in R. Arnzen and J. Thielmann (eds), Words, texts and concepts cruising the Mediterranean Sea, Peeters, Leuven, 2004, pp. 159–76.
 C. D'Ancona, Pseudo-Theology of Aristotle, Chapter I: Structure and Composition in Oriens, Brill, Leiden, 2001, pp. 78–112.
 Paul Fenton, The Arabic and Hebrew Versions of the Theology of Aristotle, in J. Kraye, W. F. Ryan and C. B. Schmitt (eds) Pseudo-Aristotle in the Middle Ages. The Theology and other Texts, The Warburg Institute, London, 1986, pp. 241–264.
 Dimitri Gutas, Greek thought, Arabic culture : the Graeco-Arabic translation movement in Baghdad and early ʻAbbāsid society (2nd-4th/8th-10th centuries) (1998: London, Routledge) 
 Shlomo Pines, La longue récension de la Théologie d'Aristote dans ses rapports avec la doctrine ismaélienne, in Revue des études Islamiques 22, 1954, pp. 7-20.
 E. K. Rowson, The Theology of Aristotle and Some Other Pseudo-Aristotelian Texts Reconsidered, in Journal of the American Oriental Society 112, 1992, pp. 478–84.
 Georges Vajda, Les Notes D'Avicenne Sur La 'Théologie D'Aristote', in Revue Thomiste 51, 1951, pp. 346-406. (Translation of Avicenna's commentary on the Theology).

On the other works
 Georges Anawati, Le néoplatonisme dans la pensée musulmane: état actuel des recherches, in Plotino e il neoplatonismo in Oriente e Occidente, Rome, 1974. (Contains text and translation of the "Letter on Divine Science").
 Rüdiger Arnzen, Aristoteles' De anima : eine verlorene spätantike Paraphrase in arabischer und persischer Überlieferung'', Brill, Leiden, 1998. 

Early Islamic philosophy
Neoplatonic texts
Pseudoaristotelian works
Plotinus
Arabic literature